The orange-backed troupial (Icterus croconotus) is a species of bird in the family Icteridae. It is found in Guyana, Brazil, Paraguay, and eastern Ecuador, Bolivia, and Peru. It is closely related to the Venezuelan troupial (Icterus icterus) and Campo troupial (Icterus jamacaii), and at one time, all three were considered to be the same species.

Name

The term troupial is from French troupiale, from troupe ("troop"), so named because they live in flocks. The Latin name icterus is from Greek ἴκτερος (íkteros, "jaundice"); the icterus was a bird the sight of which was believed to cure jaundice, perhaps the Eurasian golden oriole. It also had the more general meaning "yellow bird", which is why the name was later given to this South American bird. The specific name croconotus literally means "saffron back." (Latin crocus, "saffron," and Ancient Greek νῶτον, nôton, "back".)

Description
In colour it is bright orange apart from a black face, bib, wings and tail, and a small white patch on the secondary wing feathers. It has an orange streak on its shoulder and a small blue ring of bare skin surrounds the eye. The bib has a neat lower edge which helps to distinguish it from the Venezuelan troupial, which has a shaggy base to the bib and a much larger white streak on the wing. The song consists of a number of loud, musical phrases, mostly with two syllables.

Distribution and habitat
The orange-backed troupial is found in tropical South America east of the Andes where it is a non-migratory species. Its range extends from southern Guyana, southern Colombia and eastern Ecuador and Peru, through eastern and central Brazil to Bolivia and northern Paraguay.

Ecology
The orange-backed troupial often forages in pairs, feeding on fruits, insects and other arthropods found at all levels in the canopy. It also sips nectar from wild flowers, including Erythrina. It breeds in July and August in Colombia, and between November and March in Bolivia and Paraguay. It tends not to build its own nest but often pirates the nest of a yellow-rumped cacique (Cacicus cela).

Status
The population trend is thought to be downward because of deforestation in the Amazon rainforest, but not at such a rate as to threaten its survival, and the International Union for Conservation of Nature has rated its conservation status as being of "least concern".

References

External links

orange-backed troupial
Birds of the Guianas
Birds of the Amazon Basin
Birds of the Ecuadorian Amazon
Birds of the Peruvian Amazon
Birds of Bolivia
Birds of Paraguay
orange-backed troupial
Taxa named by Johann Georg Wagler